Le Zénith de Gainsbourg is the third live album by Serge Gainsbourg, released in 1989, featuring a March 1988 concert at the Zénith de Paris. It was the last album released in Gainsbourg's lifetime.

Track listing 
 "You're Under Arrest"
 "Qui est "in" qui est "out"
 "Five Easy pisseuses"
 "Hey Man Amen"
 "L'Homme à tête de chou"
 "Manon"
 "Valse de Melody"
 "Dispatch Box"
 "Harley David Son of a Bitch"
 "You You You but not You"
 "Seigneur et saigneur"
 "Bonnie and Clyde"
 "Gloomy Sunday"
 "Couleur café"
 "Aux armes et cætera"
 "Aux enfants de la chance"
 "Les Dessous chics"
 "Mon légionnaire"

Personnel
Serge Gainsbourg - vocals
Billy Rush - guitar, musical director
John K (John Kumnick) - bass
Gary Georgett - keyboards
Tony "Thunder" Smith - drums
Stan Harrison - saxophone
Curtis King Jr., Denis Collins - backing vocals

Charts

Certifications

References 

1989 live albums
Serge Gainsbourg albums
Philips Records albums